Theeradej Wongpuapan (Kane) (born December 3, 1977, in Bangkok, Thailand), is a Thai actor and presenter. His father, also an actor in Thailand, persuaded him to start his career in acting.

Theeradej is currently one of Thailand's most popular actors. He gained popularity after his work in the series called Song Rao Nirun Dorn. All his projects from that point on, TV dramas, movies and even TV commercials, have become popular among Thais.

According to the Suan Dusit poll, Theeradej was voted the most popular Thai male star six years in a row from 2006 to 2011 and was honored the Most Popular Star Hall of Fame in 2012, along with Thongchai McIntyre & Pachrapa Chaichua.

He received the Golden Television Awards for Best Leading Actor a record four times for his work in Ey Mah Lek (2002), Song Rao Nirun Dorn (2005), Sawan Biang (2008) and Sood Sanaeha (2009).

Biography
Theeradej Wongpuapan is the youngest child of Weeraprawat Wongpuapan (his father) and Kanchana Wongpuapan (his mother). His father is a director and mother is a TV drama writer; her pseudonyms are Worapan Rawee, Leelawadee and Daeng Rawee.

He began acting at the suggestion of his father. In 1985, when he was seven years old, he appeared in The Six Siblings (หกพี่น้อง) on Channel 3, which was directed by his father. He next acted in the TV drama My Sweet Orange Tree (ต้นส้มแสนรัก) on Channel 3. He then stopped acting to attend เซนต์ดอมินิก School until he was in high school. Then, he shortly studied for his bachelor's degree at ABAC University before he went to study at the Brooks Institute of Photography in California, USA.  He soon had to leave school, after two years of study, because of the 1997 Asian financial crisis. He returned to Thailand to be a model, presenter, and actor in TV Drama, movies, and music video. He appeared in Super Luk Toong on Channel 9 1998, followed by Queen of Luk Toong Pumpuang Duangjan (ราชินีลูกทุ่ง พุ่มพวง ดวงจันทร์) on Channel 7 in 1999, and The Ridiculous Battle (ฝนตกขี้หมูไหลคนอะไรมาพบกัน) on Channel 3 in 2000.

Ken was known extensively and popularly from "Eternal Love" ("สองเรานิรันดร") played with "Phiyada Akkaraseranee", "Chain of Love" ("อุ้มรัก") and "Paradise Diversion" ("สวรรค์เบี่ยง") with "Ann Thongprasom". The approximate rating from "นีลเส็น" of "Paradise Diversion" was 14.6; the finale was 18.7.

In "2009", he came back to play on "Bangkok Traffic Love Story" ("รถไฟฟ้ามาหานะเธอ") which was the most gaining profits movie in 2009, 145.5 million baht.

Ken was appointed to be a special Thai ambassador of "UNICEF" ("2008" – present) and a presenter of “"White Ribbon Year Project"” which campaigning the violence to children, feminine, and families. This is a project of the "Developing Social and Stability of Humans Ministry of Thailand" ("2010").

Ken Theeradej Wongpuapan's #1 leading female onscreen is Ann Thongprasom #1 Pra'nangs.

Personal life

Theeradej married "Noi" Boosakorn Pornwannasiriwej, a popular Thai actress, on October 25, 2007. Queen Sirikit participated in the ceremony.  On August 17, 2008, Noi gave birth to their first child, a boy named "Khun" Khunatum Wongpuapan. Their second child, a son named "Jun" Thippatai Wongpuapan, was born on July 4, 2010.

Theeradej's hobbies are making short films, taking pictures, naturist traveling, collecting antique watches and furniture. Basketball is his favorite sport.

Image
Theeradej is in a popular actor. In the annual Suan Dusit polls from 2006 to 2010, he was voted the most popular Thai celebrity; in 2009, he received 77% of the vote. He was also voted the most popular Thai actor in the 2009 ABAC poll, with 38.1% of the vote.

Suan Dusit Poll - "Best of The Year"
 No.3 Most Popular Thai Male Star (2005) : 23.80%
 No.1 Most Popular Thai Male Star (2006) : 38.57%
 No.1 Most Popular Thai Male Star (2007) : 53.50%
 No.1 Most Popular Thai Male Star (2008) : 69.20%
 No.1 Most Popular Thai Male Star (2009) : 73.16%
 No.1 Most Popular Thai Male Star (2010) : 76.98%
 No.1 Most Popular Thai Male Star (2011) : 40.28%
 People's Choice Most Popular Star Honor (Suan Dusit Poll Most Popular Star Hall of Fame) (2012), along with Thongchai McIntyre & Pachrapa Chaichua.

- TV3 Fanclub Award is a favour survey award for actors, actress, and TV Programmes on Channel 3 via voting in www.thaitv3.com

Filmography

Film

Dramas

Theatre

Awards
2002

1. Best Leading Actor (Ai Ma Lek) from the 17th Golden Television Awards

2005
   
1. Best Leading Actor (Song Rao Nirun Dorn) from the 20th Golden Television Awards

2. Best Leading Actor (Song Rao Nirun Dorn) from Star Entertainment Awards 2005 

3. Best Leading Actor (Song Rao Nirun Dorn) from Top Awards 2005

2006
     
1. Best Leading Actor (Oum Ruk) from Star Entertainment Awards 2006

2. Best Leading Actor (Oum Ruk) from Top Awards 2006 

2008
    
1. Best Leading Actor (Sawan Bieng) from the 23rd Golden Television Awards

2. Best Leading Actor (Sawan Bieng) from Top Awards 2008

3. Best Leading Actor (Sawan Bieng) from Siamdara Stars Party 2008

4. Best Leading Actor (Sawan Bieng) from SeeSan Bunteaung Awards 2008

5. Best Leading Actor (Jai Rao) from Hamburger Awards 2008

2009
   
1. Best Leading Actor (Sood Sanaeha) from the 24th Golden Television Awards

2. Best Leading Actor (Sood Sanaeha) from the 1st Nattaraja Awards

3. Best Leading Filmography Actor (Bangkok Traffic Love Story) from Top Awards 2009

4. Best Leading TV Drama Actor (Sood Sanaeha from Khuanjai Seu Top Awards 2009

5. Best Leading Filmography Actor (Bangkok Traffic Love Story) from Kwanjai Seu MuanChon 2009

6. Best Leading TV Drama Actor (Sood Sanaeha) from Kwanjai Seu MuanChon 2009

2010

1. Best Actor in a Lakorn (365 Wun Haeng Rak) from Top Awards 2010 - Nominated

2. Best Actor in a Lakorn (Wiwa Wah Woon) from Top Awards 2010 - Nominated

References

External links
 ["50 พระเอกในรอบ 50 ปี" นิตยสารแฮมเบอร์เกอร์ฉบับพิเศษ ตีพิมพ์ในปี 2552 หน้า 98]

1977 births
Living people
Theeradej Wongpuapan
Theeradej Wongpuapan
Theeradej Wongpuapan
Theeradej Wongpuapan
Theeradej Wongpuapan
Theeradej Wongpuapan
Thai television personalities